The Worshipful Company of Joiners and Ceilers is one of the livery companies in the City of London. The Guild of St James Garlickhythe, the company's predecessor, named after the church where it was founded, was formed in 1375. The organization of wood craftsmen, who were known at various times as fusters, carvers, and joiners, received a royal charter of incorporation in 1571.  The craft of 'ceiling' refers to the application and installation of both wall and ceiling wood panelling.

The company has traditionally been separate from the Worshipful Company of Carpenters, for historically Joiners attached wood using glue or other similar materials, while carpenters used nails or pegs.  After many years of not fully supporting their original craft ideals, the company is now pursuing a closer link with the training of apprentices both in the craft of Joinery and Ceiling (and carving), It also supports craft-related training institutions, as well as general educational establishments and selected units of the UK armed services.

The company ranks 41st in the order of precedence of the livery companies. Its motto, created by John Wilkes, a past master of the company in 1774, is Join Loyalty With Liberty.

External links
The Joiners' and Ceilers' Company

Joiners and Ceilers
1571 establishments in England